Tobira Album is J-Pop singer Rie fu's third album, released in 2007.  It reached #34 on the Oricon Albums Chart.

Track listing 
The album includes the following tracks:

 "5000 マイル～Album version" (5000 Miles)
 "Come To My Door"
 "ツキアカリ" (Moonlight)
 "君が浮かぶよ" (You Come to Mind)
 "tobira"
 "On Its Way"
 "Until I Say"
 "SMILE"
 "Feel The Same" 
 "dreams be"
 "Sunshine of my day～Live version"   
 "London"
 "あなたがここにいる理由" (The Reason You're Here)

References

2007 albums
Rie fu albums